The 195th Heavy Combined Arms Brigade is a maneuver formation of People's Liberation Army Ground Force which serves as an opposing force unit in exercises.

History
Originally designated the 195th Mechanized Infantry Brigade, it was formed on November 26, 2011 from the 1st Armored Division being split. The brigade was then a part of the 65th Army. Since its inception, the brigade was converted to a dedicated opposing force unit.

In late 2013, the brigade was transferred to the control of the Beijing Military Region. From May 2014 to September 2015, the brigade fought 33 simulated battles with other brigades and divisions of the PLA ground force at Zhurihe Combined Arms Tactics Training Center, with 32 wins and 1 loss. In April 2017 the brigade was redesignated as the 195th Heavy Combined Arms Brigade.

List of maneuvers
In exercises, various units represent the friendly "red army" (红军), while the 195th Mechanized Infantry Brigade serves as the opposing "blue army" (蓝军).  The 195th has participated in two groups of exercises. "Beijian" was a series of maneuvers held by the Beijing Military Region, and its May 2014 iteration was the only simulation lost by the opposing force (the 195th) as of 2016. The other exercises are named "Kuayue", which means "to stride over". These first began in 2009.

References

Infantry brigades of the People's Liberation Army
Military units and formations established in 2011